Jan Harlan (born 5 May 1937) is a German-American executive producer and the brother of Christiane Kubrick, director Stanley Kubrick's widow. He is the nephew of the film director Veit Harlan.

Life 
Jan Harlan was born in Karlsruhe in 1937, the son of two opera singers, Fritz Moritz Harlan (1901–1970) and his wife Ingeborg (née de Freitas). 

Harlan started out working for Kubrick as a researcher, most prominently on Napoleon, Kubrick's never-filmed epic about the French military leader, in 1968, when Kubrick asked him, as a German speaker to accompany him to Romania to organise the army scenes for the film. Harlan acted as Kubrick's executive producer for Barry Lyndon (1975), The Shining (1980), Full Metal Jacket (1987), Eyes Wide Shut (1999), and was an assistant to the producer for A Clockwork Orange (1971). Harlan was also executive producer for Steven Spielberg's A.I. Artificial Intelligence (2001), a collaboration between Spielberg and Kubrick. Harlan also directed a feature-length documentary about Kubrick, Stanley Kubrick: A Life in Pictures (2001).

In 2009 he assisted Alison Castle, a Taschen editor, in creating the book Stanley Kubrick's Napoleon: The Greatest Movie Never Made and gave a talk about the Kubrick Napoleon archives at Cambridge Film Festival in September 2010 with Alison Castle. He is the nephew of the German filmmaker Veit Harlan, best known for his work during the Third Reich including Jud Süß (1940), an antisemitic propaganda film. Jan Harlan has three sons, Manuel, Dominic and Ben. He is married to Maria.

He has for several years been a regular guest lecturer at the European Film College, and also at the University of Hertfordshire's Film and Television degrees, for which he was awarded an Honorary Doctorate in 2011.

In 2016, Harlan joined the film jury for ShortCutz Amsterdam, an annual film festival promoting short films in Amsterdam.

Filmography

Producer

References

External links

1937 births
American film directors
American film producers
Living people
German film producers
Mass media people from Karlsruhe
Stanley Kubrick
Film people from Baden-Württemberg